Olga Alexandrovna Zausaylova (born January 2, 1978, in Neftegorsk) is a triathlete from Russia, who  competed at the 2008 Summer Olympics in Beijing. Zausaylova placed thirty-sixth in the women's triathlon with a time of 2:06:24.

At the peak of her career, Zausaylova took part in 50 triathlon competitions, and had achieved twelve top-ten finishes. Her best results happened in 2003, when she claimed the gold medal at the ITU Asian Triathlon Cup in Burabay, Kazakhstan with her personal best of 1:59:24.

References

External links
 ITU Profile

1978 births
Living people
Triathletes at the 2008 Summer Olympics
Olympic triathletes of Russia
Russian female triathletes